Sir Francis Lawley, 2nd Baronet (c. 1630 – 25 October 1696) was an English courtier and politician who sat in the House of Commons between 1659 and 1679.

Lawley was the son of Sir Thomas Lawley, 1st Baronet of Spoonhill, near Much Wenlock, Shropshire. He inherited the Baronetcy and the estate on the death of his father in 1646. Lawley acquired the estate of the dissolved monastery of Canwell, in the parish of Hints, Staffordshire, which became the family seat.

In 1659, Lawley was elected Member of Parliament for Wenlock in the Third Protectorate Parliament. He was elected MP for Much Wenlock again in 1660 to the Convention Parliament. In 1661, he was elected MP for Shropshire for the Cavalier Parliament and held the seat until 1679. From 1690 to 1696, he was Master of the Jewel Office.

Lawley married Anne Whitmore, daughter of Sir Thomas Whitmore, 1st Baronet of Apley. He was succeeded by his son Thomas.

References

1630s births
1696 deaths
Baronets in the Baronetage of England
English MPs 1659
English MPs 1660
English MPs 1661–1679
Masters of the Jewel Office